Henry Williams BD was a Canon of Windsor from 1537 to 1554.

Career

He was educated in Oxford and graduated BA in 1515, MA in 1521, BD in 1531.

He was appointed:
Prebendary of North Muskham in Southwell 1533
Prebendary of Bedminster and Redcliffe in Salisbury 1535
Prebendary of York 1535
Prebendary of Lincoln 1535
Rector of West Ilsley

He was appointed to the tenth stall in St George's Chapel, Windsor Castle in 1537 and held the canonry until 1554. His date of death is not recorded and he may have been deprived of his living as a reformer.

Notes 

Canons of Windsor